Danilo Javier Peinado Lorena (born 15 February 1985 in Montevideo) is a Uruguayan professional football striker, who plays for Italian club Legnago Salus.

Club career
He has played locally for Defensor Sporting and Montevideo Wanderers. He also played for Olimpia in the Paraguayan Primera División and Oriente Petrolero in the Liga de Fútbol Profesional Boliviano.

In August 2011, Peinado was transferred to Segunda División club Recreativo de Huelva.

On 8 January 2014, Peinado transferred to China League One side Wuhan Zall.
On 18 July 2014, Peinado transferred to China League One side Guangdong Sunray Cave.

References

External links

1985 births
Living people
Footballers from Montevideo
Uruguayan footballers
Association football forwards
Uruguayan Primera División players
Segunda División players
Defensor Sporting players
Montevideo Wanderers F.C. players
Liverpool F.C. (Montevideo) players
Club Olimpia footballers
Oriente Petrolero players
Recreativo de Huelva players
C.A. Bella Vista players
Wuhan F.C. players
Guangdong Sunray Cave players
China League One players
Uruguayan expatriate footballers
Expatriate footballers in Paraguay
Expatriate footballers in Bolivia
Expatriate footballers in Spain
Expatriate footballers in China
Uruguayan expatriate sportspeople in China